The Girl from Moon Bridge (Finnish: Tyttö kuunsillalta) is a 1953 Finnish drama film directed by Matti Kassila and starring Tyyne Haarla, Ansa Ikonen and Paavo Jännes.

Cast
 Tyyne Haarla as Eva Boman  
 Ansa Ikonen as Pepi Varala  
 Paavo Jännes as Professor  
 Kullervo Kalske as Mr. Puranen  
 Arvo Lehesmaa as Prof. Anttila  
 Kaisu Leppänen as Margit  
 Kerstin Nylander as Flora Ramberg  
 Ilmi Parkkari as Silja Varala  
 Matti Ranin as Juhani Varala  
 Sven Relander as Mr. Alvenius  
 Joel Rinne as Erik Ramberg  
 Eero Roine as Judge Lindman  
 Kaarlo Saarnio as Dean  
 Vilho Siivola as Erland Varala

References

Bibliography 
 Qvist, Per Olov & von Bagh, Peter. Guide to the Cinema of Sweden and Finland. Greenwood Publishing Group, 2000.

External links 
 

1953 films
1953 drama films
Finnish drama films
1950s Finnish-language films
Films directed by Matti Kassila
Finnish black-and-white films